Dublin North-East was a parliamentary constituency represented in Dáil Éireann, the lower house of the Irish parliament or Oireachtas, from 1937 to 1977 and from 1981 to 2016. The method of election was proportional representation by means of the single transferable vote (PR-STV).

History and boundaries
The constituency was created for the 1937 general election when the Dublin City North constituency was divided into Dublin North-West and Dublin North-East. It was abolished in 1977 as a result of the Electoral (Amendment) Act 1974 when it was largely replaced by the Dublin Artane constituency before being recreated in 1981. It was subsumed into the new Dublin Bay North constituency at the 2016 general election.

TDs

TDs 1937–1977

TDs 1981–2016

Elections

2011 general election

2007 general election

2002 general election

1997 general election

1992 general election

1989 general election

1987 general election

November 1982 general election

February 1982 general election

1981 general election

1973 general election

1969 general election

1965 general election

1963 by-election
Following the death of Fine Gael TD Jack Belton, a by-election was held on 30 May 1963. The seat was won by the Fine Gael candidate Paddy Belton, brother of the deceased TD.

1961 general election

1957 general election

1956 by-election
Following the death of Independent TD Alfie Byrne, a by-election was held on 30 April 1956. The seat was won by the independent candidate Patrick Byrne, son of the deceased TD.

1954 general election

1951 general election

1948 general election

1944 general election

1943 general election
Full figures for the second, third and fourth counts are unavailable.

1938 general election

1937 general election

See also
Dáil constituencies
Politics of the Republic of Ireland
Historic Dáil constituencies
Elections in the Republic of Ireland

References

External links
Oireachtas Members Database
Dublin Historic Maps: Parliamentary & Dail Constituencies 1780–1969 (a work in progress)
Dublin Historic Maps: Some Dublin and Kingstown Wards, Between 1780 and 1954

Dáil constituencies in County Dublin (historic)
Politics of Fingal
1937 establishments in Ireland
1977 disestablishments in Ireland
Constituencies established in 1937
Constituencies disestablished in 1977
1981 establishments in Ireland
Constituencies established in 1981
2016 disestablishments in Ireland
Constituencies disestablished in 2016